Michael-Kyle Steven Pepper (born 25 June 1998) is an English cricketer. He made his first-class debut for Essex in the 2018 County Championship on 25 June 2018. He made his Twenty20 debut for Essex in the 2018 t20 Blast on 3 August 2018. He made his List A debut on 22 July 2021, for Essex in the 2021 Royal London One-Day Cup.

References

External links
 

1998 births
Living people
English cricketers
Cambridgeshire cricketers
Essex cricketers
Sportspeople from Harlow
Suffolk cricketers
Northern Superchargers cricketers